Bob Pursell may refer to:

Bob Pursell (footballer born 1889) (1889–1974), Scottish footballer who played for Liverpool and Port Vale
Bob Pursell (footballer born 1919), Scottish footballer who played for Wolverhampton Wanderers and Port Vale